Stadion Minyor, nicknamed The Stadium of Peace is a multi-purpose stadium in Pernik, Bulgaria. It is used for football matches and is the home ground of the local football club Minyor Pernik. The stadium has a capacity of 8,000 spectators. It was officially inaugurated on 30 May 1954.

The stadium initially held a capacity of 20,000 spectators, but in August 2009, the owners of the club decided to rebuild the whole western stand, and the capacity was reduced to 8,000 spectators to obtain a license from the Bulgarian Football Union.

References

Football venues in Bulgaria
Pernik
Multi-purpose stadiums in Bulgaria
Buildings and structures in Pernik Province